Shahgarh is a town and a tahsil in Sagar district in the Indian state of Madhya Pradesh. Its connected with National Highway No. 86 Route, National Highway 539 and MP SH 37.

Geography
It has an average elevation of 411 metres (1,348 feet). Here you can visit Shahgarh Fort and seven Jain mandir.

Demographics
At the 2001 India census, Shahgarh had a population of 14,585. Males constituted 52% of the population and females 48%. Shahgarh had an average literacy rate of 62%, higher than the national average of 59.5%: male literacy was 69% and female literacy 53%. 18% of the population were under 6 years of age.

References

Sagar, Madhya Pradesh
Cities and towns in Sagar district